

Champions
World Series: Philadelphia Athletics over Chicago Cubs (4-1)

Awards and honors
League Award
 Rogers Hornsby, Chicago Cubs, 2B

Statistical leaders

Major league baseball final standings

American League final standings

National League final standings

Negro leagues final standings

Negro National League final standings

† Nashville was not in the league but their games counted in the standings.

American Negro League final standings

Baltimore was awarded the Pennant as they reportedly won both halves of the season.

Events

January–April
January 22 – The New York Yankees announce they will put numbers on the backs of their uniforms, becoming the first baseball team to start continuous use of the numbers. The first numbers are based on positions in the batting order; thus, Babe Ruth will wear number 3 and Lou Gehrig number 4. In a few weeks, the Cleveland Indians announce that they, too, will put numbers on the uniforms. By , all American League teams will use them. It will be  before all National League players are numbered.
January 29 – James R. Price, secretary of the Boston Red Sox, commits suicide at Fenway Park.
February 28 – The Chicago White Sox trade Bibb Falk to the Cleveland Indians for Chick Autry.
April 16 – On opening day, Hall of Famer Earl Averill makes his major league debut in the Cleveland Indians' 5-4 eleven inning victory over the Detroit Tigers. The St. Louis Browns defeat the Chicago White Sox, 3–1; the Pittsburgh Pirates defeat the Chicago Cubs, 4–3, and the St. Louis Cardinals defeat the Cincinnati Reds 5–2.
April 16 – Charlie Gelbert makes his MLB debut for the St. Louis Cardinals. 
April 17 – The Detroit Tigers rout the Cleveland Indians 15–3. Tigers outfielder Harry Heilmann drove in five runs.
April 18 – The Cincinnati Reds trade Val Picinich to the Brooklyn Robins for Rube Ehrhardt and Johnny Gooch.
April 18 – Roy Johnson makes his MLB debut for the Detroit Tigers. Johnson lead the league in doubles with 45 in his rookie season.
April 19 – Hall of famer Rick Ferrell makes his major league debut in the St. Louis Browns' 5–4 loss to the Chicago White Sox.
April 27 – Brooklyn Robins relief pitcher Clise Dudley is the first player ever to hit a home run off the first pitch he sees. Regardless of the achievement, Brooklyn loses 8–3 to the Philadelphia Phillies.

May–August
May 1
The Philadelphia Athletics defeat the Boston Red Sox 24–6 at Fenway Park. The 24 runs matches a franchise record, and the 29 hits set another franchise mark.
Both games in the National League (the Chicago Cubs in Cincinnati and the Pittsburgh Pirates in St. Louis) are called 4-4 ties after thirteen innings.
May 4- The Chicago Cubs faced the Philadelphia Phillies in a double header. The Cubs swept the double header by a combined score of 25–7. Cubs beat the Phillies 16–0 in the first game, and beat them 9–7 in the nightcap. Neither starter Alex Ferguson, game one or Charlie Wiloughby, game two, made it to the third inning.   
May 8 – Carl Hubbell pitches a no-hitter for the New York Giants in an 11–0 victory over the Pittsburgh Pirates.
 May 8 – In an 8–1 victory over the St. Louis Browns, Lou Gehrig, Leo Durocher and Tony Lazzeri combined for a double play. Both Gehrig and Lazzeri would be part of another double play in that game, this time with pitcher Waite Hoyt.
May 13 – At League Park, the Cleveland Indians defeat the New York Yankees, 4–3, in the first game played in Major League history in which players from both teams wear uniform numbers on the back of their jerseys.
May 24 – The Detroit Tigers defeat the Chicago White Sox 6–5 in 21 innings. Winning pitcher George Uhle pitches twenty innings to earn his eighth win of the season with no losses. The losing pitcher is Ted Lyons, who pitched all 21 innings for Chicago.
June 20 – Red Badgro, who had been playing professional football since , makes his major league debut as an outfielder with the St. Louis Browns.
July 3 – Nine double plays are turned in the Chicago Cubs' 7–5 victory over the Cincinnati Reds.
July 6 – After losing 10–6 in the opener of a double header against the Philadelphia Phillies, the St. Louis Cardinals score ten runs in the first inning on their way to a 28–6 victory in the second game. The two teams combine to collect a record 73 hits in a double header.
July 24 – With a win over the New York Giants and a 6–4 loss by the Pittsburgh Pirates at the hands of the Brooklyn Robins, the Cubs claim sole possession of first place in the National League by half a game. They hold first place the remainder of the season.
August 11 – Babe Ruth hit his 500th career home run in the second inning off Willis Hudlin at Cleveland's League Park. The homer was Ruth's 30th of the year, but it wasn't enough as the Indians beat the Yankees, 6–5.
August 17 – The New York Yankees purchase Lefty Gomez's contract from San Francisco of the Pacific Coast League.

September–December
September 1 – The Detroit Tigers signed Hank Greenberg as a free agent. Exact date the team signed him is unknown.
September 21 – Connie Mack's Philadelphia Athletics win their 100th game of the season, 10–7, over the Detroit Tigers.
October 5 – The Philadelphia Phillies' Lefty O'Doul goes six-for-nine in a double header with the New York Giants on the last day of the season for the Phillies, ending the season with a .398 batting average.
October 7 – The Brooklyn Robins select pitcher Sloppy Thurston from San Francisco Seals of the Pacific Coast League as part of the rule 5 draft.  
October 8 – Howard Ehmke, who was in the twilight of his career, and had made only eleven appearances for the Philadelphia Athletics during the regular season, is handed the ball for the first game of the 1929 World Series. He gives up just one unearned run in the ninth inning to lead the A's to a 3–1 victory over the Chicago Cubs.
October 9 – Jimmie Foxx has a pair of home runs to lead the A's to a 9–3 victory in game two of the World Series.
October 10 – Hall of fame outfielder Max Carey retires after he is released by the Brooklyn Robins.
October 11 – Philadelphia Athletics game two starting pitcher George Earnshaw is the starter in game three of the World Series as well, and pitches all nine innings. The Cubs win their only game of the World Series, 3–1.
October 12 – Behind 8–0, the Philadelphia Athletics explode for ten runs in the seventh inning to win game four of the World Series, 10–8. Mule Haas has a three-run inside-the-park home run during the inning.
October 14 – Down 2–0 with one out in the ninth inning, the A's score three runs to claim their first World Championship since . Bing Miller delivers the World Series winning hit.
October 18- The Cincinnati Reds purchase the contract of outfielder Bob Meusel from the New York Yankees.
December 11 – The St. Louis Browns trade Wally Schang to the Philadelphia Athletics for Sammy Hale.

Births

January
January 2 – Ed Wolfe
January 4 – Corky Valentine
January 9 – Lottie Beck
January 11 – Don Mossi
January 13 – Moe Savransky
January 17 – Eilaine Roth
January 20 – Gale Wade
January 27 – Bobby Kline
January 27 – Samuel Taylor
January 30 – Bill Abernathie
January 31 – Duke Maas

February
February 5 – Al Worthington
February 11 – Ralph Beard 
February 16 – Fred Hahn
February 18 – Cal Neeman
February 22 – Ryne Duren
February 22 – Charlie Peete
February 23 – Elston Howard
February 26 – Dorice Reid
February 28 – Ed Albrecht

March
March 7 – Red Wilson
March 10 – Bud Thomas
March 21 – Pidge Browne
March 27 – Milt Smith
March 28 – Bill Macdonald

April
April 1 – Mary Ellen Kimball
April 3 – Art Ditmar
April 4 – Tookie Gilbert
April 6 – Don Elston
April 9 – Hank Morgenweck
April 12 – Mel Held
April 16 – Ed Winceniak
April 18 – Steve Kraly
April 20 – Harry Agganis
April 21 – Charles ‘Buzz’ Bowers
April 26 – Walt Kellner
April 29 – Mickey McDermott
April 29 – Steve Ridzik

May
May 3 – Helen Walulik
May 7 – Dick Williams
May 18 – Jack Sanford
May 19 – Curt Simmons
May 23 – Spider Wilhelm
May 27 – George O'Donnell
May 29 – Velma Abbott
May 29 – Roberto Vargas

June
June 2 – Louise Erickson
June 2 – René Valdés
June 8 – Jerry Dahlke
June 10 – Hank Foiles
June 11 – Frank Thomas
June 13 – Bud Swartz
June 14 – Lillian Shadic
June 18 – Bill Upton
June 19 – Don Ferrarese
June 20 – Wally Burnette
June 26 – Dick Tettelbach
June 27 – Dick Marlowe

July
July 2 – Chuck Stobbs
July 4 – Bill Tremel
July 4 – Bill Tuttle
July 6 – Angelo LiPetri
July 7 – John Romonosky
July 8 – John Powers
July 9 – Héctor López
July 9 – Wally Post
July 14 – Bob Purkey
July 14 – Pat Scott
July 17 – Roy McMillan
July 19 – Alice Pollitt
July 20 – Mike Ilitch
July 21 – Jerry Snyder
July 28 – Ted Lepcio

August
August 4 – Joe Pignatano
August 7 – Don Larsen
August 9 – Bernice Metesch
August 14 – Jim Pisoni
August 16 – Curt Roberts
August 26 – Tom Poholsky

September
September 1 – Mava Lee Thomas
September 11 – Luis García
September 12 – Tom Herrin
September 15 – Lee Wheat
September 18 – Mary Lou Beschorner
September 19 – Ray Shearer
September 22 – Harry Bright
September 24 – Jim Mangan
September 30 – Marv Blaylock

October
October 1 – Jaynie Krick
October 3 – Nancy Mudge
October 8 – Bob Mabe
October 10 – Bobby Tiefenauer 
October 11 – Skeeter Kell 
October 12 – Cartha Doyle
October 17 – Hardy Peterson 
October 23 – Bruce Barmes
October 24 – Jim Brosnan
October 26 – Roland Hemond
October 27 – Ange Armato

November
November 9 – Don Plarski
November 11 – Ike Delock
November 14 – Jimmy Piersall
November 17 – Norm Zauchin
November 20 – Lou Berberet
November 23 – John Anderson
November 23 – Shirley Palesh
November 30 – Leo Kiely

December
December 1 – Nino Escalera
December 13 – Billy Loes
December 14 – Carl Linhart
December 14 – Pete Whisenant
December 15 – Ray Herbert
December 18 – Gino Cimoli
December 23 – Al Cicotte
December 28 – Jean Marlowe
December 30 – Bill Taylor

Deaths

January
January 2 – Denny Lyons, 62, third baseman who batted .310 lifetime, set record with 255 putouts in 1887; led American Association in slugging in 1890.
January 3 – Charlie Smith, 48, pitcher who played from 1902 through 1914 for the Cleveland Bronchos, Washington Senators, Boston Red Sox and Chicago Cubs, ending with a 2.81 ERA in 1,349 innings
January 7 – Law Daniels, 66, catcher/outfielder for two seasons from 1887 to 1888.
January 9 – Frank Bliss, 76, catcher for the 1878 Milwaukee Grays.
January 11 – Mike Golden, 77, pitcher and outfielder for the Keokuk Westerns, Chicago White Stockings, and Milwaukee Grays during his two-season career in 1875 and 1878.
January 13 – Buck West, 68, outfielder for the 1884 Cincinnati Red Stockings and the 1890 Cleveland Spiders.
January 14 – Fred Hayner, 57, pitcher for the 1890 Pittsburgh Alleghenys.
January 18 – Michael Scanlon, 85, manager of two different Washington Nationals franchises in the 1880s
January 23 – Henry Killilea, 65, attorney and team owner nicknamed "Godfather of the American League"; as owner of the Boston Americans (August 1901 to April 1904), he organized, with his Pittsburgh Pirates counterpart Barney Dreyfuss, 1903's first-ever World Series between the champions of the two major leagues
January 24 – Charlie Hautz, 76, first baseman for the 1875 St. Louis Red Stockings and the 1884 Pittsburgh Alleghenys.
January 28 – Al Strueve, 68, catcher/outfielder for the 1884 St. Louis Browns.
January 30 – John Wood, 56, pitcher for the 1896 St. Louis Browns.

February
February 1 – Walt Wilmot, 65, who led the National League in homeruns in 1890, and also scored 100 or more runs three times and twice collected 70 or more stolen bases.
February 2 – Thorny Hawkes, 76, second baseman for the 1879 Troy Trojans and the 1884 Washington Nationals.
February 2 – Mike Walsh, 78, Irish umpire in the National inaugural season in 1876, who later officiated in the National Association and the American Association and also managed the 1884 Louisville Colonels.
February 11 – Dutch Ulrich, 29, native of Habsburg Empire and pitcher for the Philadelphia Phillies from 1925 through 1927.
February 13 – Joe Straub, 71, German catcher who played in part of three seasons with the Troy Trojans, Philadelphia Athletics and Columbus Buckeyes between 1880 and 1883.
February 26 – Jim Moroney, 45, pitcher for the Boston Beaneaters, Philadelphia Phillies and Chicago Cubs in part of three seasons spanning 1906–1912.

March
March 1 – Ed Foster, 43, pitcher for the 1908 Cleveland Naps.
March 2 – Tom Smith, 57, pitcher for the Boston Beaneaters, Philadelphia Phillies, Louisville Colonels and St. Louis Browns in four seasons between 1894 and 1898.
March   5 – Lou Hardie, 64, catcher/outfielder for the Philadelphia Quakers, Chicago White Stockings, Boston Beaneaters and Baltimore Orioles in parts of four seasons spanning 1884–1891.
March 13 – Sherry Magee, 44, left fielder for the Phillies who led the National League in RBI four times, and in hits, runs and doubles once each; also a batting champion in 1910, while his 441 career stolen bases included 23 thefts of home plate, and later became a NL umpire in 1928.
March 23 – Denny Williams, 32, outfielder who played from 1921 to 1928 for the Cincinnati Reds and Boston Red Sox.
March 25 – Roy Meeker, 28, pitcher for the Philadelphia Athletics and Cincinnati Reds over parts of the three season between 1923 and 1926,
March 30 – Phil Redding, 39, pitcher who played  with the St. Louis Cardinals from 1912 to 1923.

April
April 5 – Tom Crooke, first baseman for the Washington Senators during the 1909 and 1910 seasons.
April 12 – Tom Phillips, 40, pitcher for the St. Louis Browns, Cleveland Indians and Washington Senators in parts of four seasons spanning 1915–1922.
April 13 – John Castle, 49, outfielder for the 1910 Philadelphia Phillies.
April 13 – John Kelty, 58, outfielder for the 1890 Pittsburgh Alleghenys.
April 20 – Bill Kissinger, 57, pitcher who played from 1895 through 1897 with the Baltimore Orioles and St. Louis Browns.
April 30 – Dan Long, 61, outfielder for the 1890 Baltimore Orioles.

May
May 13 – George Stallings, 61, manager who led the Miracle Braves to the 1914 World Series title, who also skippered the Phillies, Tigers and New York Highlanders.
May 25 – Harvey Blauvelt, 61, relief pitcher for the 1890 Rochester Broncos.
May 28 – Ollie Beard, 67, shortstop for the Cincinnati Red Stockings/Reds from 1889 to 1890 and third baseman for the 1891 Louisville Colonels; it is claimed that his family invented the Kentucky dish, Burgoo.

June
June 15 – Tim Flood, 52, second baseman for the St. Louis Perfectos in 1899 and the Brooklyn Superbas from 1902 to 1903.
June 16 – George Carman, 63, shortstop for the 1890 Philadelphia Athletics.
June 16 – Mike Sullivan, 69, outfielder for the 1888 Philadelphia Athletics.
June 18 – Frank Bishop, 68, infielder for the 1884 Chicago Browns.

July
July 2 – Buck Hooker, 48, pitcher who played from 1902 through 1903 for the Cincinnati Reds.
July 3 – Bill McClellan, 73, second baseman/shortstop for five teams between 1878 and 1888, primarily for the Brooklyn Grays/Bridegrooms from 1885 to 1888.
July 5 – Ted Sullivan, 78, Irish outfielder/manager in the 1880s, who led the St. Louis Maroons of the Union Association to an astonishing 94–19 record in the 1884 season.
July 8 – Joe Kappel, 72, backup outfielder/infielder for the 1884 Philadelphia Quakers and the 1890 Philadelphia Athletics.
July 9 – Pete Cassidy, 56, first baseman who played with the Louisville Colonels, Brooklyn Superbas and Washington Senators in parts of two seasons spanning 1896–1899.
July 12 – Jack Cronin, 55, pitcher who played seven seasons with seven teams in two different leagues between 1895 and 1904.
July 19 – Tom O'Rourke, 63, backup catcher for the Boston Beaneaters, New York Giants and Syracuse Stars in parts of four seasons spanning 1887–1890.
July 20 – Rupert Mills, 36, first baseman for the 1915 Newark Peppers of the Federal League, who, due to a term in his contract, "played" the non-existent 1916 season by showing up at the ballpark each day in uniform and ready to play, thereby earning his 1916 salary.
July 21 – Frank Gilmore, 65, pitcher who played from 1886 through 1888 for the Washington Nationals.
July 24 – George Miller, 76, backup catcher for the 1877 Cincinnati Reds and the 1884 Cincinnati Red Stockings.

August
August 5 – Tony Brottem, 38, catcher/first baseman for the St. Louis Cardinals. Washington Senators and Pittsburgh Pirates during three seasons between 1916 and 1921.
August 6 – Andy Cusick, 71, Irish catcher who played from 1884 through 1887 with the Wilmington Quicksteps and the Philadelphia Quakers.
August 8 – Dan Minnehan, 63,  third baseman for the 1895 Louisville Colonels.
August 11 – Red Long, 52, Canadian pitcher for the 1902 Boston Beaneaters.
August 15 – Jack Manning, 75, right fielder/pitcher for eight teams during 12 seasons in three different leagues, who in 1884 became the third player the collect a three-homerun game, behind Ned Williamson and Cap Anson.
August 27 – Charlie Snow, 80,  catcher for the 1874 Brooklyn Atlantics.
August 28 – Ed Flynn, 65, catcher for the 1887 Cleveland Blues.

September
September 2 – Bert Blue, 51, backup catcher who played for the St. Louis Browns and the Philadelphia Athletics during the 1908 season.
September 22 – Ice Box Chamberlain, 61, pitcher who played for six teams in 10 seasons between 1886 and 1896, who led the American Association in shutouts (1890) and ranks 64th on the all-time complete games list (265).
September 25 – Miller Huggins, 50, Hall of Fame manager who guided the New York Yankees to its first six American League pennants (1921–23; 1926–28) and three World Series titles (1923, 1927–28), including the legendary 1927 Murderers Row squad.
September 27 – John Gochnaur, 54, shortstop for the Brooklyn Superbas and the Cleveland Bronchos/Naps, who committed 98 errors in 1903, undoubtedly the worst major league single-season ever for a defensive player.

October
October 1 – Lee Richmond, 72, pitcher whose 32 victories for the 1880 Worcesters Ruby Legs included the first perfect game in major league history.
October 2 – Buck Hopkins, 46, backup outfielder for the St. Louis Cardinals in the 1907 season.
October 9 – Red Kleinow, 42, catcher from 1904 through 1911 for the New York Highlanders, Boston Red Sox and Philadelphia Phillies.
October 14 – Joe Borden, 75, pitcher with just a two-season career, who hurled the first no-hitter in professional organized baseball, and later won the first game in National League history.
October 22 – Walt Lerian, 26, promising catcher of the Philadelphia Phillies from 1928 through 1929, who died just days after the conclusion of the 1929 season, when he was hit by out-of-control truck while standing on a Baltimore street.
October 22 – Jim Manning, 67, outfielder/infielder for the Boston Beaneaters, Detroit Wolverines and Kansas City Cowboys in parts of five seasons spanning 1884–1889, who later managed the Washington Senators during the inaugural season of the American League in 1901.

November
November 8 – Red Bittmann, 67, second baseman for the 1889 Kansas City Cowboys.
November 10 – Mark Baldwin, 66, pitcher for five teams in three different leagues from 1887 to 1893, who posted a 154–165 record and a 3.37 ERA in 346 games, while leading the American Association with 33 wins in 1890 and for the most innings pitched in 1889 (513.2) and 1890 (492), and collected 296 complete games, which ranks him 46th on the all-time career list.
November 11 – Sam White, 36, English catcher for the Boston Braves during the 1919 season.
November 14 – Joe McGinnity, 58, Hall of Fame pitcher whose 246 victories included eight 20-win seasons, while leading the National League in wins five times, in innings four times and games six times, as his 31 wins for the 1903 New York Giants included three complete August doubleheaders, and also won 239 games in the minor leagues.
November 15 – Billy Nash, 64, prominent third baseman for the Richmond Virginians, Boston Beaneaters and Philadelphia Phillies from 1884 through 1898, who posted a .275 batting average with 60 home runs and 979 runs batted in for 1550 games, while scoring 100 runs four times and collecting 110 or more RBI two times, also leading the National League in putouts, double plays and fielding average four times each.
November 20 – Babe Doty, 61, pitcher who played for the 1890  Toledo Maumees.
November 20 – Jim Powell, 70, first baseman who played from 1884 to 1885 with the Richmond Virginians and the Philadelphia Athletics.
November 29 – Jimmy Whelan, 39, who appeared as a pinch-hitter in one game for the 1913 St. Louis Cardinals.

December
December 11 – Doc McMahon, 42, pitcher for the 1908 Boston Red Sox in their inaugural season, who defeated the New York Highlanders, 11–3, in his only major league appearance.
December 12 – Dick Buckley, backup catcher in 524 games for the Indianapolis Hoosiers, New York Giants, St. Louis Browns and Philadelphia Phillies from 1888 through 1895.